Devendra Pandey was an Indian politician affiliated with the Indian National Congress, who served as a Member of Legislative Assembly (MLA) twice from Jaisinghpur Legislative Assembly from 1980 to 1985 and 1985 to 1989. He also served as the Uttar Pradesh State General Secretary of the Indian National Congress. He died at 67 on September 23, 2017.

He came into the limelight in 1978, when Pandey hijacked an Indian Airlines Flight 410, en-route on a domestic flight from Calcutta to Lucknow with the help of a toy gun in protest against the arrest of Indira Gandhi. In the plane hijack case, he was imprisoned in Lucknow jail for nine months and 28 days. Later, when the Congress government came to power, on the instructions of the then Prime Minister Indira Gandhi, the government withdrew the case against him in 1980. Devendra Pandey was close to Indira Gandhi and Rajiv Gandhi.

After the death of Indira Gandhi, Rajiv Gandhi also gave the assembly ticket to Devendra Pandey in 1985 and 1989. In 1985, Devendra again won the assembly, but in 1989 he lost the election.

Posts held

See also 
 Bholanath and Devendra Pandey
 List of hijackings of Indian aeroplanes

References 

Uttar Pradesh MLAs 1980–1985
Uttar Pradesh MLAs 1985–1989
Indian National Congress politicians from Uttar Pradesh
2017 deaths